Djabal Club d'Iconi is a Comorian sports club located in Iconi, Comoros. Its football team currently plays in Comoros Premier League. Its basketball teams plays in the national top division, and has played in the Road to BAL tournament in 2022.

Players to feature for the Comoros national team are Fasoiha Goula Soilihi and Chadhouli Mradabi.

Titles
Comoros Premier League: 1
2012

Performance in CAF competitions
CAF Champions League: 1 appearance
2013 – preliminary round

References

External links
Team profile – Soccerway.com

Football clubs in the Comoros
Sport in Grande Comore